Siboni is a surname. Notable people with the surname include:

Daniel Siboni (born 1959), French photographer
Gabi Siboni (born 1957), Israeli colonel
Giuseppe Siboni (1780–1839), Italian operatic tenor, opera director, choir conductor, and voice teacher
Marcello Siboni (born 1965), Italian racing cyclist